Francesco "Ciccio" Troise is a retired Italian footballer and coach. He has previously worked with Giuseppe Sannino and Fabio Cannavaro.

Career
Following the end of his playing career, Troise began coaching in the amateur game in Naples. In 2013, he became the technical assistant of Giuseppe Sannino at Chievo Verona. In December 2013, Troise was appointed assistant coach to Sannino at English Championship side Watford. He left the club with Sannino in August 2014, with the same staff being appointed at Catania the following month. They remained at the club for three months.

In 2015, Troise moved to China to work under Fabio Cannavaro at Guangzhou Evergrande. In 2016, he re-united with Cannavaro at Saudi Arabian club Al Nassr, and would work under him again when he returned to China to coach Tianjin Quanjian. There they won the second tier championship to win promotion, and finished third in the Chinese Super League the following season, qualifying for the Asian Champions League.

In 2017, Troise joined Cannavaro's staff as he returned to Guanghzou Evergrande. Under Cannavaro's management the club won a league championship, twice finished second and also won the Cup of China and reached the semi-finals of the Champions League. In 2019, midway through their time at Guangzhou, Cannavaro and Troise coached the Chinese national side.

References

Italian footballers
Association footballers not categorized by position
Year of birth missing
Guangzhou F.C. non-playing staff
Watford F.C. non-playing staff